Esperanzah! is a world music festival which has been offering a varied programme of well-known and less familiar artists since 2002. It takes place at Floreffe Abbey, between Charleroi and Namur in Belgium. It is organised by the nonprofit organisation Z! which also organised Verdur Rock (in 2015 and 2016) as well as Jyva'Zik.

Characteristics 
Two stages are built to be used by more than 20 groups. The stage "côté jardin"  showcases artists of various origins who remain true to their roots or offer musical projects that combine instruments, rhythms and melodies from different traditions. As for the "côté cour" stage, it is more urban and offers a mix of genres between traditional rhythms and more modern music. Artists hosted include: Tryo, Manu Chao, Patti Smith, La Ruda Salska, Les Ogres de Barback, La Rue Ketanou, La Kinky Beat, Les Hurlements d'Leo, La Phaze, N&SK, Dub Incoroporation, Balkan Beat Box, Marcel et son Orchestre, Saule, Hocus Pocus, Fauve, and others.

The festival also offers film screenings, artistic creations, conferences, activities for children, craftsmen and restaurants from around the world, street artists, a fair trade cocktail bar, Esperanzah! radio 24 hours a day and two campsites. The public is also educated on the importance of sorting waste.

History 

During its first edition in 2002, the festival welcomed about  visitors. In 2013, there were almost  spectators, and nearly 46,000 in 2014.

Radio Esperanzah! 
Since the 2004 edition, Radio Esperanzah, a temporary radio station launched by people involved in free radio in French-speaking Belgium, has been covering the festival, thus enabling listeners online to experience the festival.

Notes and references

External links 

Site officiel du festival Esperanzah! The official website of the festival (in French)
Le site de Radio Esperanzah! The website of Radio Esperanzah! (in French)

World music festivals
Music festivals in Belgium
French-language radio stations in Belgium